Die Blitzkinder was a comedy rock project that performed in Boston clubs in 1989 and 1990.  It featured vocalist Springa from SSD, backed by The Slaves. All concerned wore Gestapo uniforms (minus the Swastikas) as Springa played on German stereotypes.  Musically they were closer to The Slaves than to SSD.

American comedy musical groups